McNicholl is a surname. Notable people with the surname include:

Brian McNicholl (born 1951), New Zealand Paralympic athlete
Dermot McNicholl (born 1965), Irish Gaelic footballer
John McNicholl, Northern Irish country singer
Johnny McNicholl (born 1990), New Zealand rugby union player

See also
McNichol

Patronymic surnames